Erdenet Stadium is an association football stadium in the Erdenet, Mongolia. The stadium has a capacity of 3,000 spectators and features an artificial turf playing surface. It is home to Mongolian Premier League club Khangarid FC.

References

Football venues in Mongolia